The Middle States Intercollegiate Football League (MSIFL) was an early intercollegiate athletic football conference which played for the 1893 and 1894 seasons.

Member Schools 
The members who made up the MSIFL were Lafayette College, Rutgers College (now Rutgers University–New Brunswick) and Stevens College (now Stevens Institute of Technology).

Champions
 1893 – Lafayette (2–0)
 1894 – Rutgers (2–0)

See also
List of defunct college football conferences

References

Defunct college sports conferences in the United States
College sports in New Jersey
College sports in Pennsylvania
American football in New Jersey
American football in Pennsylvania